William Gooch may refer to:

Sir William Gooch, 1st Baronet (1681–1751), governor of Virginia, 1727–1749
William Gooch (astronomer) (1770–1792), English astronomer on the Vancouver Expedition